Panorama is a daily newspaper published in Gibraltar. It was founded in December 1975 by journalist Joe Garcia who has edited it since then. It was first published as a weekly newspaper and became a daily in 2002. It was the first Gibraltar newspaper to establish an online edition, in 1997. 
From its inception, the paper has been a strong defender of the Freedom of the Press, and believes in publishing the views of all sectors of Gibraltar society.
Its editor Joe Garcia was the first Gibraltar journalist to receive an award in The Queen's Honours List for his services to journalism in Gibraltar and overseas.
He has written extensively about Gibraltar in publications abroad, such as the London Financial Times (for 25 years) and Spain's leading daily El Pais (for 10 years).

See also
 Communications in Gibraltar

1975 establishments in Gibraltar
English-language newspapers published in Europe
Newspapers published in Gibraltar
Newspapers established in 1975
Weekly newspapers